Oumaima El-Bouchti (born 7 October 2000) is a Moroccan taekwondo practitioner. She is a silver medalist at the African Games and the Islamic Solidarity Games. She is also a two-time gold medalist at the African Taekwondo Championships. She represented Morocco at the 2020 Summer Olympics held in Tokyo, Japan.

Career 

At the 2018 African Taekwondo Championships held in Agadir, Morocco, she won the gold medal in the women's 53 kg event. In the same year, she also won one of the bronze medals in the women's 49 kg event at the 2018 Mediterranean Games in Tarragona, Spain.

In 2019, she competed in the women's bantamweight event at the World Taekwondo Championships held in Manchester, United Kingdom. In that same year, she represented Morocco at the 2019 African Games held in Rabat, Morocco and she won the silver medal in the women's 53 kg event. In the final, she lost against Chinazum Nwosu of Nigeria.

At the 2021 African Taekwondo Championships held in Dakar, Senegal, she won the gold medal in the women's 49 kg event. A few months later, she competed in the women's 49 kg event at the 2020 Summer Olympics held in Tokyo, Japan where she was eliminated in her first match by Sim Jae-young of South Korea.

Achievements

References

External links 
 

Living people
2000 births
Place of birth missing (living people)
Moroccan female taekwondo practitioners
African Games medalists in taekwondo
African Games silver medalists for Morocco
Competitors at the 2019 African Games
African Taekwondo Championships medalists
Mediterranean Games medalists in taekwondo
Mediterranean Games bronze medalists for Morocco
Competitors at the 2018 Mediterranean Games
Taekwondo practitioners at the 2020 Summer Olympics
Olympic taekwondo practitioners of Morocco
Islamic Solidarity Games medalists in taekwondo
Islamic Solidarity Games competitors for Morocco
21st-century Moroccan women